The National Basketball League was the first professional basketball league in the world. Centered in Philadelphia, Pennsylvania, the league's teams stretched from New York City to Central New Jersey, through the Philadelphia area and down to Wilmington, Delaware. The league began operations with the 1898–99 season and disbanded in January 1904, before completing the 1903–04 season.

The league was originally intended to consist of two separate geographic districts, one based in Philadelphia and the other in New York City. The New York district never got off the ground, however.

The league makes its debut 
The league debuted on December 1, 1898, with a game between the Trenton Nationals and the Hancock Athletic Association at Textile Hall in Philadelphia's Kensington section.  The Nationals rallied in the second half to win, 21–19, before 900 fans.

The 1898–99 season saw six teams in the league. Three were in Philadelphia (Clover Wheelmen, Germantown Nationals, and Hancock Athletic Association), and three were in New Jersey (Millville Glass Blowers, Camden Electrics, and Trenton Nationals). Two of the Philadelphia teams folded before New Year's Eve 1898, but the other four completed the season, with the Trenton Nationals winning the first championship with an 18–2–1 record.

The following season was more stable for the new league. The season was divided into two halves. Teams in the first half were Trenton, New York Wanderers, Camden Electrics, Pennsylvania Bicycle Club, Bristol Pile Drivers, and Chester, PA. 
The New York Wanderers joined, and only one team, out of Chester, Pennsylvania, dropped out, and it was immediately replaced by the Millville team, which had originally elected not to participate that season. Trenton and Millville provided the best teams in the loop, with Trenton gaining a disputed championship, in which the team won both halves of the season.

League expands schedule 
The National Basketball League began the 1900–01 season with seven teams and an expanded schedule of 32 games. Of the seven teams, six finished the season.  Only the newest team, from Burlington NJ, failed to complete the season. The seven teams were the New York Wanderers, Trenton Nationals, Millville Glass Blowers, Bristol Pile Drivers, Camden Skeeters, Pennsylvania Bicycle Club, and Burlington.

With five of the seven teams finishing with records of .500 or better, NBL fans saw the good competitive play from most teams throughout the season. In this season the Camden team also went by the handle of Camden Skeeters. With the split season dropped, no playoffs were necessary, and the New York Wanderers captured the League title by three games.

The 1901–02 season may have been the most successful year of the National Basketball League in terms of stability, with six strong franchises, namely the Bristol, New York, Trenton, Camden, Millville, and Philadelphia teams from the previous year. The schedule expanded once again to 40 games, every game saves one was played as scheduled, no teams dropped out, and there was only one really weak team in the league. Camden finally became more than a .500 team and lost the league crown to the Bristol Pile Drivers by only 3 games. Bristol had a 28–12 record.

League in decline 
1902–1903 was the season was again a split season. There were eight first-half teams: Camden Electrics, New York Wanderers, Bristol Pile Drivers, Philadelphia Phillies, Trenton Potters, Conshohocken, and Burlington Shoe Pegs. The second half of the season saw only six teams: Camden Electrics, Burlington Shoe Pegs, Wilmington Peaches, Trenton Potters, New York Wanderers, and Conshohocken. Two teams dropped out before the season finished. The Burlington team was doing so poorly that its owner-coach, Frank Reber, fired his entire team, purchased the Bristol franchise and used Bristol's players to represent Burlington. Phillies manager and future member of the Basketball Hall of Fame, Frank Morgenweck, disbanded his Phillies team to purchase the Wilmington team.

Camden Electrics, coached by Billy Morgenweck (Frank's brother), cruised to 36 wins against only 9 defeats, a winning percentage of .800. The first half record was 15–2, and the second-half record was 21–7.

Things did not go very well during the offseason in 1903 in the National Basketball League. Only five teams elected to play that year. More importantly, New York, Burlington, and Wilmington, all with experienced owners and coaches, failed to return. The league began the season with only five teams: Camden Electrics, Trenton Potters, Conshohocken, Millville Glass Blowers, and St. Bridget's Biddies. Trenton dropped out on December 26, 1903, and Camden left on  December 31. The National Basketball League was disbanded on January 4, 1904, not without controversy, and at least one lawsuit followed its demise. Billy Morgenweck was subsequently sued by investors in the Camden Electrics.

Champions 
1898–1899 Trenton Nationals
1899–1900 Trenton Nationals
1900–1901 New York Wanderers
1901–1902 Bristol Pile Drivers
1902–1903 Camden Electrics
1903–1904 Camden Electrics were in first place when the league disbanded.

See also 
 National Basketball League (United States) 1937–49 (defunct) 
 NBL

External links 
 APBR list of teams and standings
 https://probasketballencyclopedia.com

Defunct basketball leagues in the United States
1898 establishments in Pennsylvania
1904 disestablishments in the United States